Rozgonyi may refer to:
 Cecília Rozgonyi (née Szentgyörgyi), the daughter of Péter Szentgyörgyi
 Simon Rozgonyi (? - 1414), a Hungarian nobleman and royal judge
 László Rozgonyi
 István Rozgonyi (? - after 1440), son of László, Comes of Timişoara
 David Rozgonyi (born 1976, Libya), an American/Hungarian author and world traveler
 Marcel Rozgonyi (born 1976), a Hungarian-German football player

Hungarian-language surnames

de:Rozgonyi